Peter Bonne Collenburg Thomsen (born 9 October 1978) is a former Danish cricketer. Thomsen's batting and bowling styles are unknown. He was born at Glostrup, Frederiksborg County.

Thomsen represented Denmark under-19 team in six youth One Day Internationals in 1998, before playing a single List A fixture for Denmark in the 1999 NatWest Trophy against the Kent Cricket Board. In his only List A appearance, he was dismissed for a duck by Kevin Masters.

References

External links
Peter Thomsen at ESPNcricinfo
Peter Thomsen at CricketArchive

1978 births
Living people
People from Glostrup Municipality
Danish cricketers
Sportspeople from the Capital Region of Denmark